Joseph Abbott (baptized 10 June 1790 – 10 January 1862) was a Canadian clergyman in the Anglican Church of Canada, and the father of John Joseph Caldwell Abbott, the third Prime Minister of Canada. Joseph Abbott was baptized in Little Strickland, in the United Kingdom.  His parents were Joseph Abbott and Isabella Abbott. He is also the great-great-grandfather of Canadian actor Christopher Plummer. He is known for writing two books, Memoranda of a settler in Lower Canada; or, the emigrant in North America and Philip Musgrave; or memoirs of a Church of England missionary in the North American colonies.

External links
Biography at the Dictionary of Canadian Biography Online
Google Books entry for  Memoranda of a settler in Lower Canada; or, the emigrant in North America
Google Books full text of Philip Musgrave; or memoirs of a Church of England missionary in the North American colonies

1790 births
1862 deaths
Canadian Anglican priests
English emigrants to pre-Confederation Quebec
Immigrants to Lower Canada
Parents of prime ministers of Canada
People from Little Strickland